Krooran is a 1989 Indian Malayalam film, directed by K. S. Gopalakrishnan. The film stars Jagathy Sreekumar and Priya in the lead roles. The film has musical score by Rathnasoori.

Cast
Jagathy Sreekumar
Priya

Soundtrack
The music was composed by Rathnasoori and the lyrics were written by Bharanikkavu Sivakumar.

References

External links
 

1989 films
1980s Malayalam-language films